The Latécoère 22 was a French mailplane built for Lignes Aériennes Latécoère in 1927.

Design
The Latecoere 22 was a single-seat high-wing parasol monoplane intended for mail freight.

Specifications (Latécoère 22)

References

Further reading
 

Parasol-wing aircraft
22
Aircraft first flown in 1927